Heart of Mary Medical Center, now owned by OSF HealthCare,  formerly Provena Covenant Medical Center is a 210-bed non-profit hospital in Urbana, Illinois, USA. It is part of the OSF HealthCare System, headquartered in Peoria. HMMC is accredited by the Joint Commission and the Commission on Accreditation of Rehabilitation Facilities (CARF).

History
The hospital was formed by the merging of two hospitals, Burnham City Hospital and Mercy Hospital, in 1989. Burnham City Hospital was founded in 1894 and Mercy Hospital was founded by the Servants of the Holy Heart of Mary in 1919. In 1997, the medical center became part of the Provena Health system and was renamed Provena Covenant Medical Center.

Services
Key services include regional emergency medical services, in-patient psychiatry, orthopedics, cardiovascular and pulmonary care, cancer care, birthing center, pediatric services, rehabilitation center and a women's health center.

Awards
Heart of Mary Medical Center has been recognized by HealthGrades for total knee replacement and joint replacement surgery.

Tax-exempt case
In 2002, the Champaign County Board of Review challenged Provena Covenant's tax-exempt status based on debt-collection tactics and the amount of charity care offered. Ultimately, the Illinois Department of Revenue denied Provena Covenant's status, which led to the matter being considered by the circuit court of Sangamon County, Illinois, which sided with Provena Covenant. The matter was then considered by the Appellate Court and, later, the Illinois Supreme Court which both rendered decisions against Provena Covenant's tax-exempt status. In a March 18, 2010, judgment by the Illinois Supreme Court (Provena Covenant Medical Center vs. the (Illinois) Department of Revenue), the Court agreed that the Department of Revenue had acted properly in denying charitable and religious property tax exemptions requested by Provena Hospitals. In the judgment, the Court noted that "a mere 302 of its (Provena Covenant's) 110,000 admissions received reductions in their bills based on charitable considerations." The court added, "uninsured patients were charged PCMC’s “established” rates, which were more than double the actual costs of care. When patients were granted discounts at the 25 and 50 percent levels, the hospital was therefore still able to generate a surplus." In response, Jon Sokolski, Chair of the Board of Provena Covenant Medical Center, said, "We are deeply disappointed that the Illinois Supreme Court has denied the property tax exemption of Provena Covenant Medical Center. Provena…cares for all in our community who need our health services regardless of their ability to pay. In 2008, we provided more than $38 million in free care and other community benefits."

References

External links
Official website
Illinois Supreme Court Decision, Provena Covenant Medical Center vs Department of Revenue, March 18 2010

Hospitals in Illinois
Buildings and structures in Urbana, Illinois